David Barrow Dick (1930 – 2010), was an American journalist. He was an Emmy-winning correspondent for CBS News from 1966 to 1985. He became a professor of journalism at the University of Kentucky after retiring from CBS News.

Early life and education 

David Dick was born on 18 Feb 1930 in Cincinnati, Ohio. He was raised in Bourbon County, Kentucky, where he attended school, and later after graduation, he attended the University of Kentucky where he obtained his bachelor's and later master's degrees in English Literature. He served in the US Navy during the Korean War.

Career at CBS 

From 1959 to 1966, Dick worked at WHAS Radio and WHAS TV in Louisville, where he served as a writer before advancing to an on-air journalist. From 1966 to 1985 he was a correspondent with CBS News anchored by Walter Cronkite.

His assignment locations included Washington, D.C., Atlanta, Georgia, and Dallas, Texas. He also worked as Bureau Chief for CBS' Latin America Bureau in Caracas. While in Dallas, he covered Mexico, Central, and South America. 

He won an Emmy for his coverage of the attempted assassination of George Wallace during his bid for president in 1972. He covered the aftermath of the mass suicides in Guyana.

Later life and legacy 
Upon retirement, Dick became an Associate Professor of Journalism at the University of Kentucky. He also wrote a column for Kentucky Living magazine. He wrote and publish several books including "Follow the Storm" in 2002.

He died from prostate cancer on July 16, 2010, in Bourbon County, Kentucky. He is buried North Middletown Cemetery in North Middletown, Kentucky.

The University of Kentucky created The David Dick "What a Great Story!" Storytelling Awards program in his memory.

Works by David Dick 

 A Journal for Lalie: Living Through Prostate Cancer
 Peace at the Center
 A Conversation with Peter P. Pence
 The Quiet Kentuckians
 The Scourges of Heaven
 Follow the Storm: A Long Way Home
 Jesse Stuart – The Heritage, a look at the Kentucky author Jesse Stuart

With his wife Lalie Dick, he two co-authored:

 Home Sweet Kentucky
 Rivers of Kentucky
 Kentucky: A State of Mind.

References

External links 

1930 births
2010 deaths
People from Cincinnati
News & Documentary Emmy Award winners
University of Kentucky alumni
University of Kentucky faculty
People from Bourbon County, Kentucky
Writers from Kentucky
Television personalities from Kentucky
Journalists from Kentucky
United States Navy personnel of the Korean War
Radio personalities from Louisville, Kentucky
CBS News people
20th-century American journalists
American male journalists
Deaths from prostate cancer
Burials in Kentucky